Raanee is a 2014 Maldivian melodrama film directed by Mohamed Aboobakuru. Produced by Hussain Rasheed under Emboomaa Studio, the film stars Mohamed Manik, Sheela Najeeb and Fathimath Azifa in pivotal roles. The film was an unofficial remake of Raj Kanwar's melodrama film Judaai (1997) starring Anil Kapoor, Sridevi and Urmila Matondkar. The film was released on 29 May 2014 and received negative reviews from critics.

Premise
Ismail (Mohamed Manik), an honest and dedicated staff working under the wealthy businessman, Adam Manik (Ahmed Nimal), is married to an ungrateful woman, Mariyam (Sheela Najeeb) who thirsts for money and fame. Adam Manik's daughter, Nathasha (Fathimath Azifa) returns from abroad and works at her father's firm, where she falls in love with Ismail, witnessing his integrity and commitment. However she becomes heartbroken when she discovers that Ismail is a married man with two kids. Failed to convince Ismail into marrying her as his second wife, Nathasha offers two million rufiyaa in exchange for marriage to Ismail which she accepts on the spot.

Cast 
 Mohamed Manik as Ismail
 Sheela Najeeb as Mariyam
 Fathimath Azifa as Nathasha
 Ahmed Nimal as Adam Manik
 Mohamed Waheed as Mariyam's father
 Sarah Binthi Mohamed as Maiha
 Mohamed Aik Ashraf Rasheed as Namhan
 Ali Mahir
 Ali Ismail

Soundtrack

Release and response
The film was released on 29 May 2014. Upon release, it received mainly negative reviews from critics. A reviewer from Avas criticised the whole production of the film and wrote: "Even though the actors give their best with their earnest performances, the weak screenplay and the awful direction could not save this ship from sinking. A total snooze fest no where close to the original, which shall be best left undone".

References

Maldivian drama films
2014 films
Remakes of Maldivian films
2014 drama films
Dhivehi-language films